Mr. B may refer to:
 Mr. B (album), an album by jazz trumpeter Chet Baker
 George Balanchine, choreographer, co-founder and balletmaster of the New York City Ballet 
 Mark Braun, a boogie-woogie piano player
 Billy Eckstine, a jazz bandleader and balladeer
 Mr. B, a character in the literacy program The Letter People
 Mr. B, a character in Samuel Richardson's book, Pamela, or Virtue Rewarded
 Mr. B, a character in the Nigerian sitcom Basi & Company.
 A codename for John Murphy, a loyalist paramilitary from Northern Ireland
 The nickname of Bernard Lansky, the owner of the famed Lansky Brothers clothier in Memphis, Tennessee.
 Mr. B The Gentleman Rhymer, alter ego of musician Jim Burke
 The nickname Hazel uses for the character George Baxter in the T.V. sitcom HAZEL(1961-1966)